In enzymology, an all-trans-retinol 13,14-reductase is an enzyme, encoded by the RETSAT gene, that catalyzes the chemical reaction

all-trans-13,14-dihydroretinol + acceptor  all-trans-retinol + reduced acceptor

Thus, the two substrates of this enzyme are all-trans-13,14-dihydroretinol and acceptor, whereas its two products are all-trans-retinol and reduced acceptor. Under physiological conditions the reaction proceeds in the opposite direction catalyzing the saturation of the 13-14 double bond of all-trans-retinol.

This enzyme belongs to the family of oxidoreductases, specifically those acting on the CH-CH group of donor with other acceptors. The systematic name of this enzyme class is all-trans-13,14-dihydroretinol:acceptor 13,14-oxidoreductase. Other names in common use include retinol saturase, RetSat, (13,14)-all-trans-retinol saturase, and all-trans-retinol:all-trans-13,14-dihydroretinol saturase.

The gene has also been called PPAR-alpha-regulated and starvation-induced gene protein.

References

Further reading

EC 1.3.99
Enzymes of unknown structure